Campiglossa ochracea is a species of tephritid or fruit flies in the genus Campiglossa of the family Tephritidae.

Distribution
The species is found in Central Europe, Southwest of Russia.

References

Tephritinae
Insects described in 1927
Diptera of Europe